Luis Carlos may refer to:

Luís Carlos (footballer, born 1972), Portuguese football winger
Luís Carlos Lima de Souza (born 1977), Brazilian football winger
Luís Carlos (footballer, born 1982), Portuguese football attacking midfielder
Luís Carlos Dallastella (born 1987), Brazilian football goalkeeper
Luís Carlos Lima (born 1987), Brazilian football winger
Luis Carlos (footballer, born 1990), Spanish football winger
Luis Carlos Cardoso da Silva (born 1984), Brazilian paracanoeist

See also
Luiz Carlos (disambiguation)